This list presents representative academic journals covering sociology and its various subfields.

A

 Acta Sociologica
 The American Journal of Economics and Sociology
 American Journal of Sociology
 American Sociological Review
 Annales. Histoire, Sciences sociales
 Année Sociologique
 Annual Review of Sociology
 Armed Forces & Society
 Articulo – Journal of Urban Research

B

 Body & Society
 British Journal of Sociology

C

 Chinese Sociological Review
City and Community
 Comparative Studies in Society and History
 Contemporary Jewry
 Contemporary Sociology
 Contributions to Indian Sociology
 Contexts
 Criminology
 Critical Sociology
 Current Sociology

D

 Demography
 Deviant Behavior

E

 Electronic Journal of Sociology
 Ethnic and Racial Studies
 European Sociological Review

G
 Gender and Research
 Gender and Society

I

 International Review of Social History
 International Journal of Sociology
 International Journal of Social Research Methodology==J==

Journal of Applied Social Science
Journal of Artificial Societies and Social Simulation
 Journal of Contemporary Ethnography
 Journal of Family Issues
 Journal of Health and Social Behavior
 Journal of Homosexuality 
 Journal of Marriage and Family
 Journal of Mundane Behavior
 Journal of Politics & Society
 Journal of Research in Crime and Delinquency
 Journal of Sociology
 Journal of World-Systems Research

K

 Kölner Zeitschrift für Soziologie und Sozialpsychologie

M

 Men and Masculinities
 Migration Letters
 Mobilization: The International Quarterly Review of Social Movement Research

N

 Nature and Culture

P

 Population and Development Review
 Public Culture

Q

 Qualitative Sociology
 Quality & Quantity

R

 Research and Practice in Social Sciences
 Rural Sociology

S

 Science and Society
 Signs: Journal of Women in Culture and Society
 Social Currents
 Social Forces
 Social Justice
 Social Networks
 Social Problems
 Social Psychology Quarterly
 Social Research
 Society
 Socio-Economic Review
 Sociological Forum
 Sociological Inquiry
 Sociological Insight
 Sociological Methodology
 Sociological Perspectives
 Sociological Quarterly
 Sociological Research Online
 Sociological Theory
 Sociology
 Sociology of Education
 Symbolic Interaction

T

 Teaching Sociology
 Tönnies-Forum

W

 Work and Occupations

Y

 Youth & Society

See also 
 List of academic journals

External links 
 Sociology and Political Science Journals at SCImago Journal Rank
 Sociology Journals listed in Social Sciences Citation Index
 Scopus indexed journals in subject area: Sociology and Political Science
 

 
Journals
Sociology